The Merry Wives of Windsor is an English play by William Shakespeare which was first published in 1602.

The Merry Wives of Windsor may also refer to:

 The Merry Wives of Windsor (opera), an 1849 German opera by Otto Nicolai 
 The Merry Wives of Windsor (1910 film), a 1910 American silent historical comedy film
 The Merry Wives of Windsor (1918 film), a 1918 German silent comedy film
 The Merry Wives of Windsor (1950 film), an East German adaptation of the opera directed by Georg Wildhagen
 The Merry Wives of Windsor (1965 film), an Austrian-British adaptation of the opera directed by Georg Tressler
 BBC Television Shakespeare, Season Five - The Merry Wives of Winsor (1982) directed by David Jones

See also
 Overture to The Merry Wives of Windsor, a 1953 Oscar-winning film of a performance of the opera's overture